Andreas Bengtsson (born 22 February 1996) is a Swedish footballer who plays for HB Køge.

References

External links 
 

1996 births
Living people
Swedish footballers
Swedish expatriate footballers
Association football defenders
Halmstads BK players
HB Køge players
Allsvenskan players
Superettan players
Swedish expatriate sportspeople in Denmark
Expatriate men's footballers in Denmark